The 47th General Assembly of Nova Scotia represented Nova Scotia between 1960 and August 29, 1963.

Division of seats

There were 43 members of the General Assembly, elected in the 1960 Nova Scotia general election.

List of members

Former members of the 47th General Assembly

References 

Terms of the General Assembly of Nova Scotia
1960 establishments in Nova Scotia
1963 disestablishments in Nova Scotia
20th century in Nova Scotia